Opened in 1977 in Marin County, CA, the Marin Computer Center was the world's first public access microcomputer center.  The non-profit company was co-created by David Fox (later to become one of Lucasfilm Games' founding members) and Annie Fox an author.

MCC (as it was known) initially featured the Atari 2600, an Equinox 100, 9 Processor Technology Sol 20 computers (S-100 bus systems), the Radio Shack Model I and the Commodore PET. In addition to providing computer access to the public it had classes on the programming language BASIC. Later it added Apple II and Atari 800 computers, for a total of about 40 systems.

The Foxes left MCC in 1981, turning it over to new management, and later to the teens and young adults who helped run it.

See also
 Public computer

External links
Marin Computer Center in People's Computers, Nov-Dec 1978
You Want to Open a What? - Article from Creative Computing, November 1984
Electric Eggplant
Scan of 1981 advertisement for Marin Computer Center

Buildings and structures in Marin County, California
History of computing